Sanda Toma may refer to:

Sanda Toma (canoeist) (born 1970), Romanian Olympic sprint canoeist
Sanda Toma (rower) (born 1956), Romanian Olympic rower